The Mardi Gras Mystery is the 81st book in the Nancy Drew series. Set in New Orleans at Mardi Gras, it concerns a mysterious art theft.

Characters 
Nancy Drew - the young detective
Ned Nickerson - Nancy's boyfriend
Bess Marvin - Nancy's friend
George Fayne - Bess' cousin
Brian Seaton - friend of Ned
Bartholomew Seaton - Brian's father
Michael Westlake - Brian's grandfather
Carson Drew - Nancy's father
Ferdinand Koch - local art dealer
Warren Tyler - Mr. Seaton's rival
Max Devereaux - an art forger
Mariel Devereaux - Max's daughter

Plot summary 

In The Mardi Gras Mystery, Nancy's boyfriend, Ned Nickerson, is invited to spend the vacation with Brian Seaton, an Emerson College friend. On their way to the Seaton Mansion, Brian stops at Warren Tyler's house to pick up his father, Bartholomew Seaton, and at the same time shows Ned a portrait of his late mother, Danielle Seaton, by the famous artist Lucien Beaulieu. The painting is in the possession of Mr. Tyler since he found it in a barn he bought.

The friends leave for Seaton Mansion or "The Bat Hallow". They wear fancy dress for the Mardi Gras celebration. Later that evening they go to the Silver Yacht Club. That night the portrait is stolen. The prime suspect is Mr. Seaton, who is supposed to have wanted his wife's portrait.  All the evidence points to him: he was wearing a bat costume, like the thief, and he was missing at the crucial time, around 10:00 p.m.

Nancy cannot resist the challenge of the mystery. Her investigation leads to the French Quarter where she sees a woman who looks like Danielle except that her face is scarred. She is shocked and hypothesizes that Danielle could have survived the sailboat accident.

Later she finds out the woman is Mariel Devereaux, whose father Max is an art forger. Nancy concludes that Max used his daughter as a model for the painting because of her almost perfect resemblance to Danielle. He purposely left it in the barn so that it would be found by Mr. Tyler, Danielle's suitor and Bartholomew's rival. His plan was to steal his own painting and ransom it for a million dollars. The money was to pay for his daughter's plastic surgery.

Adaptation 
The 17tth installment in the Nancy Drew point-and-click adventure game series by Her Interactive, named Nancy Drew: Legend of the Crystal Skull, is loosely based on the novel.

See also
The Haunted Showboat, another Nancy Drew mystery set in New Orleans at Mardi Gras

Nancy Drew books
1988 American novels
1988 children's books
Novels set in New Orleans
Novels adapted into video games